The North Broad Street Mansion District is a historic district in Lower North Philadelphia, Pennsylvania. It is roughly bounded by Broad, Jefferson, Willington, and Oxford Streets, along the west side of the street it was named for. It comprises 76 contributing buildings and 15 non-contributing buildings over 15 acres.

The district was added to the National Register of Historic Places in 1985.

References

Houses on the National Register of Historic Places in Pennsylvania
Victorian architecture in Pennsylvania
Historic districts in Philadelphia
Templetown, Philadelphia
Houses in Philadelphia
Historic districts on the National Register of Historic Places in Pennsylvania
National Register of Historic Places in Philadelphia